Pop Warner refers to

 Glenn Scobey "Pop" Warner, an early 20th-century American college football coach
 Pop Warner Little Scholars, a non-profit organization named after the coach that offers youth American football and cheerleading and dance programs
 Ron Warner (baseball), manager of the Memphis Redbirds, a AAA minor league professional baseball team in the Pacific Coast League
 Pop Warner Trophy